Club Atlético Chiapas is a Mexican football club were play in the Segunda División de México, but it now called Chiapas F.C. Premier Reserves. The club is based in Tuxtla Gutiérrez, Chiapas.

History
The club was founded in 1999 and played in the Primera A, Liga Premier de Ascenso and Liga de Nuevos Talentos. 

The team was founded in 1999 and was registered in the Segunda División, in 2001 it got a place in the Primera A after buying the license from Real San Sebastián. However, in the summer of 2002 Jaguares de Chiapas was created and registered in Primera División, so Atlético Chiapas was relocated to Mérida, Yucatán and was renamed Atlético Yucatán.

In 2013 the team was recovered to participate in the Liga de Nuevos Talentos, forming part of the structure of Chiapas F.C. In 2014 the team was promoted to the Liga Premier de Ascenso after obtaining the Unión de Curtidores license.

In the summer of 2015, the FMF forced the participating clubs of Liga MX to have a reserve team taking part in the Liga Premier de Ascenso, so Atlético Chiapas was reformed to become Chiapas F.C. Premier, for which Atlético Chiapas was dissolved.

Competitive record

Notes

See also
Football in Mexico

References

External links
Atletico Chiapas 

Football clubs in Chiapas
Association football clubs established in 1999
1999 establishments in Mexico
Tuxtla Gutiérrez